Teorema may refer to:

 Teorema (film), 1968 film by Pier Paolo Pasolini
 Teorema (journal), an academic journal of philosophy
Teorema (2007 song), by Miguel Bosé from the album Papitour
Teorema (1993 song), by Mina from the album Lochness vol. 1-2
Teorema (1992 song), by Tony Tammaro from the album Da Granto Farò il Cantanto
Teorema (1985 song), by Legião Urbana from the album Legião Urbana (album)
Teorema (1981 song), by Marco Ferradini
Teorema (1976 song), by Brian Bennett, from the soundtrack of The Opening of Misty Beethoven

See also

 Teorama, North Santander, Colombia
 Theorema (disambiguation)
 Theory (disambiguation)
 Theorem